Abbey Town railway station was on the branch line off the Solway Junction Railway in the English county of Cumberland (later Cumbria). The first station after Abbey Junction on the branch to  Silloth on the Solway Firth, it served the village of Abbey Town. The station closed with the line to Silloth in 1964.

History
Opened as Abbey by the Carlisle and Silloth Bay Railway in 1856, then renamed Abbey Town by the North British Railway in 1889, it became part of the London and North Eastern Railway during the Grouping of 1923.  The  station then passed on to the London Midland Region of British Railways on nationalisation in 1948. The station closed on 7 September 1964.

References

Further material

External links
 Pictures of the station, via Cumbrian Railways Association
 Carlisle & Silloth Bay Railway, via Cumbrian Railways Association
 The area's railways, via Holme St Cuthbert History Group
 Abbey Town station on navigable 1956 O. S. map, via npe Maps
 The station on an Edwardian OS map, via National Library of Scotland
 The station via Rail Map Online

Former North British Railway stations
Disused railway stations in Cumbria
Railway stations in Great Britain opened in 1856
Railway stations in Great Britain closed in 1964
Beeching closures in England
1856 establishments in England
1964 disestablishments in England